Posyolok Uchkhoza Novoanninskogo Selkhoztekhnikuma is a rural locality (a khutor) in Novoanninsky Urban Settlement, Novoanninsky District, Volgograd Oblast, Russia. The population was 8 as of 2010.

Geography 
The village is located in steppe on the Khopyorsko-Buzulukskaya Plain, 270 km from Volgograd, 16 km from Novoanninsky.

References 

Rural localities in Novoanninsky District